The royal we, majestic plural, or royal plural, is the use of a plural pronoun (or corresponding plural-inflected verb forms) used by a single person who is a monarch or holds a high office to refer to themselves. A more general term for the use of a we, us, or our to refer to oneself is nosism.

Example 
After the United Kingdom had been asked to arbitrate a boundary dispute between Argentina and Chile, King Edward VII issued the adjudication of the requested arbitration, known as the Cordillera of the Andes Boundary Case. The sentence following the preamble of the award begins as follows:

In this quotation, underlining has been added to the words that exemplify the use of the majestic plural.

Western usage 
The royal we is commonly employed by a person of high office, such as a monarch or other type of sovereign. It is also used in certain formal contexts by bishops and university rectors. William Longchamp is credited with its introduction to England in the late 12th century, following the practice of the Chancery of Apostolic Briefs.

In the public situations in which it is used, the monarch or other dignitary is typically speaking not only in their own personal capacity but also in an official capacity as leader of a nation or institution. In the grammar of several languages, plural forms tend to be perceived as deferential and more polite than singular forms. This grammatical feature is common in languages that have the T–V distinction. English used to have this feature but lost it over time, largely by the end of the 17th century.

In diplomatic letters, such as letters of credence, it is customary for monarchs to use the singular first-person (I, me, my) when writing to other monarchs, while the majestic plural is used in royal letters to a president of a republic.

In Commonwealth realms, the sovereign discharges their commissions to ranked military officers in the capacity of we.  Many official documents published in the name of the monarch are also presented with royal we, such as letters patent, proclamation, etc.

Popes have historically used the we as part of their formal speech, for example as used in Notre charge apostolique, Mit brennender Sorge, and Non abbiamo bisogno.  
Since Pope John Paul II, however, the royal we has been dropped by popes in public speech, although formal documents may have retained it.  Recent important papal documents still use the majestic plural in the original Latin but are given with the singular I in their official English translations.

In 1989, Margaret Thatcher, then Prime Minister of the United Kingdom, was met with disdain by some in the press for using the royal we when announcing to reporters that she had become a grandmother in her "We have become a grandmother" statement.

Non-Western usage 
Several prominent epithets of the Bible describe the Hebrew God in plural terms: Elohim, Adonai, and El Shaddai. Many Christian scholars, including the post-apostolic leaders and  Augustine of Hippo, have seen the use of the plural and grammatically singular verb forms as support for the doctrine of the Trinity. The earliest known use of this poetic device is somewhere in the 4th century AD, during the Byzantine period; nevertheless, scholars such as Mircea Eliade, Wilhelm Gesenius, and Aaron Ember, claim that Elohim is a form of majestic plural in the Torah.

In Imperial China and every monarchy within its cultural orbit (including Japan, Korea, and Vietnam), the majestic imperial pronoun was expressed by the character zhèn (Old Chinese: *lrəmʔ). This was in fact the former Chinese first-person  pronoun (that is, 'I'). However, following his unification of China, the emperor Shi Huangdi arrogated it entirely for his personal use.  Previously, in the Chinese cultural sphere, the use of the first-person pronoun in formal courtly language was already uncommon, with the nobility using the self-deprecating term guǎrén 寡人 ('lonely one') for self-reference, while their subjects referred to themselves as chén 臣 ('subject', original meaning 'servant' or 'slave'), with an indirect deferential reference like zúxià 足下 ('below [your] foot'), or by employing a deferential epithet (such as the adjective yú, 'foolish'). While this practice did not affect the non-Chinese countries as much since their variants of zhèn and other terms were generally imported loanwords, the practice of polite avoidance of pronouns nevertheless spread throughout East Asia. . This still persists, except in China, where, following the May Fourth Movement and the Communist Party victory in the Chinese Civil War, the use of the first-person pronoun 我 wǒ, which dates to the Shang dynasty oracle inscriptions as a plural possessive pronoun, is common.  

In Hindustani and other Indo-Aryan languages, the majestic plural is a common way for elder speakers to refer to themselves, and also for persons of higher social rank to refer to themselves. In certain communities, the first-person singular may be dispensed with altogether for self-reference and the plural nosism used uniformly.

In Islam, several plural word forms are used to refer to Allah.

In Malaysia, before the Yang di-Pertuan Agong takes office, he will first take an Oath, in which the Malay word for We, Kami, would be the pronoun used.

See also 
 Pluralis excellentiae
 Royal one
 Singular they
 T–V distinction

References 

Personal pronouns
Sociolinguistics
Grammatical number
Etiquette